William H. Frazier (born 1838) was a state legislator in South Carolina. He represented Colleton County, South Carolina in the South Carolina House of Representatives from 1872 to 1874.

He served on the Committee on Retrenchment and Reform. He was.an African American.

See also
African-American officeholders during and following the Reconstruction era

References

1838 births
Year of death missing
People from Colleton County, South Carolina
Members of the South Carolina House of Representatives
African-American state legislators in South Carolina
African-American politicians during the Reconstruction Era